HMP Greenock is a prison located in Greenock, Scotland, serving designated courts in western Scotland by holding male prisoners on remand, and short-term convicted prisoners. It also provides a national facility for selected prisoners serving 12 years or over, affording them the opportunity for progression towards release. It also accommodates a small number of female prisoners ranging from remand to long-term. Although officially labelled as HMP Greenock, it continues to be known by its original name Gateside Prison.

Senior Management
HMP Greenock's Governor is Mrs Morag Stirling and the Deputy Governor is Mr. Gerry Watt.

Residential areas
HMP Greenock is divided into five separate residential areas.

Arran and Bute
Work began to build Arran and Bute halls in August 2013, with work completed in July 2014. These Halls are a new type of facility called Community Integration Units (CIU) They will hold 8 and 6 prisoners respectively, who will use their time there as a stepping stone in to the community.

Ailsa Hall
Ailsa Hall is the Prison's largest hall with a design capacity of 131, although this is usually exceeded. It holds remand prisoners, short term prisoners (STPs) and a small selection of long term prisoners (LTPs). This hall is all single-cell accommodation with electric power in cells and integral sanitation facilities.

Darroch Hall
Darroch Hall accommodates female offenders. This hall is all single accommodation with electric power in cells and integral sanitation facilities. Darroch Hall is designed to accommodate 56 prisoners.

Chrisswell House
The role of Chrisswell House is to prepare LTPs for progression to open conditions at HMP Castle Huntly. It has electric power in cells with shared sanitation facilities. Chrisswell House is designed to hold 64 prisoners.

Visits
Visits are run 7 days a week, with three sessions run Monday to Friday and two sessions at the weekend. The times below apply to both remand and convicted prisoners.

Ailsa Hall prisoners may receive visitors every day of the week.

Darroch Hall prisoners may receive visitors every day of the week.

Chrisswell House prisoners may receive visitors every day of the week.

Monday to Friday
Session 1: 15:10 - 15:55
Session 2: 18:45 - 19:30
Session 3: 19:50 - 20:35

For information regarding which sessions are set aside for each hall you can telephone the vestibule officer on 01475 88 33 00.
Sessions last a maximum of 50 minutes during the week, but can be cut to 30 minutes should any operational need arise, for example, an incident occurring between sessions.
Further details of local rules may be obtained at HMP Greenock visiting page.

Saturday & Sunday
Visits at weekends are either 75 minutes for the family session or 60 minutes for the remaining sessions, and may be reduced to 30 minutes for operational reasons. Rule 63 of The Prisons and Young Offenders Institutions (Scotland) Rules 2006 for convicted prisoners and Rule 64 of The Prisons and Young Offenders Institutions (Scotland) Rules 2006 for untried and civil prisoners

Saturday
Session 1(family with children session): 13:40 - 14:50, 
Session 2 (Ailsa and Chrisswell): 15:15 - 16:15

Sunday
Session 1(Ailsa and Chrisswell) : 13:40 - 14:50, 
Session 2(Darroch) : 15:15 - 16:15

Notable prisoners
 Edward Cairney – Murderer of Margaret Fleming, who in 2016 was discovered to have disappeared while under Cairney and his partner's care in 1999 or 2000. The was the subject of the 2019 BBC documentary Murder Trial: The Disappearance of Margaret Fleming
 Abdelbaset al-Megrahi - Found guilty of 270 counts of murder in 2001 in connection with the 1988 Lockerbie bombing, which remains the worst act of terrorism to take place on British soil. Released in 2009 on compassionate grounds due to prostate cancer, from which he died in 2012.

References

1. Her Majesty's Inspectorate of Prisons for Scotland, Report on HM Prison Greenock 2001

External links

 HM Prison Greenock on Scottish Prison Service website
 Full inspection report published February 2006

Prisons in Scotland
Buildings and structures in Inverclyde
1910 establishments in Scotland
Government agencies established in 1910
Young Offender Institutions in Scotland
Buildings and structures in Greenock